The eight great surnames of Chinese antiquity were among the most important Chinese surnames in Chinese antiquity. They are all Chinese ancestral surnames, and as such have Chinese clan surnames branching off from them During the earliest Chinese antiquity, Chinese society focused on women. Family names often passed from women to their children. Because of this phenomenon, these eight surnames have a component of their hanzi representing the character woman (女).

As of 2019 very few people have one of these surnames as a family name. An exception is the surnames Yao and Jiang. Of these, there are some well-known Chinese of modern times with these names today. One example is Yao Ming (姚明).

The eight surnames 
姞 is also sometimes considered one of the eight great surnames of Chinese antiquity.
姞 then replaces the surname 妊.

See also

 Eight surnames of Zhurong

References

Chinese-language surnames
Ancient China
Eight Great Surnames of Chinese Antiquity
Chinese clans